Heroes Reborn is an American television series with 13 episodes which premiered on September 24, 2015, as a continuation of the NBC superhero serial drama series Heroes. Series creator Tim Kring returned as executive producer. During the 2015 Super Bowl, NBC aired a 16-second teaser promo for the series. The series follows several individuals with special powers who are fleeing vigilantes but must save the world.

On July 9, 2015, a six-chapter web-series titled Dark Matters was released to introduce the characters and story of Heroes Reborn. On January 13, 2016, it was announced that Heroes Reborn would not be renewed for a second season.

Plot
According to the official synopsis, the miniseries will "reconnect with the basic elements of the show's first season" in which ordinary people discover that they have special abilities. A six-chapter prequel web-based series titled Dark Matters was released on July 9, 2015, to introduce the new characters and story lines.

The series takes place one year after a terrorist attack in Odessa, Texas. The government blames those with extraordinary abilities ("Evolved humans", or "Evos"), who are forced into hiding when vigilantes systematically hunt and kill them. Two such killers, Luke and Joanne Collins, are seeking revenge for the son they lost at the Odessa bombing.

Noah Bennet is also in hiding, but is found by the conspiracy theorist Quentin Frady, who tries to show him the truth behind the Odessa tragedy.  Meanwhile, new characters are discovering their own unique abilities. In Illinois, Tommy tries to live a normal life with his dream girlfriend, Emily, after being forced to move and change his name to hide his powers. In Tokyo, Miko is looking for her missing father, but her quest to find him could prove deadly. A new hero is emerging in Los Angeles through Carlos, a former soldier whose brother (an Evo) tried to protect people with powers. Malina is an innocent teenager who, although inexperienced with her powers, has a great destiny. Meanwhile, in the shadows, Erica Kravid, the head of the highly successful tech conglomerate Renautas, has acquired Primatech with dark goals.

As the number of Evos grows, some heroes of the past, including Hiro Nakamura, Matt Parkman, Mohinder Suresh, The Haitian René, Angela Petrelli, Micah Sanders, and Molly Walker, cross paths with the new, emerging Evos. Together, they must save the world from a geomagnetic reversal that will leave the planet vulnerable to lethal solar radiation.

Heroes creator Tim Kring said in interviews that, rather than a direct continuation, Heroes Reborn takes place considerably after the events of the original series. He stated that "This is not the fifth season, this is actually the 10th season".

Cast

Main
 Jack Coleman as Noah Bennet
 Zachary Levi as Luke Collins
 Robbie Kay as Tommy Clark
 Danika Yarosh as Malina Bennet
 Kiki Sukezane as Miko Otomo & Katana Girl
 Ryan Guzman as Carlos Gutierrez
 Rya Kihlstedt as Erica Kravid
 Gatlin Green as Emily Duval
 Henry Zebrowski as Quentin Frady
 Judi Shekoni as Joanne Collins

Guest
 Sendhil Ramamurthy as Dr Mohinder Suresh
 Jimmy Jean-Louis as René, the Haitian
 Noah Gray-Cabey as Micah Sanders
 Masi Oka as Hiro Nakamura
 Cristine Rose as Angela Petrelli
 Greg Grunberg as Matt Parkman

Recurring
 Francesca Eastwood as Molly Walker
 Nazneen Contractor as Farah Nazan
 Pruitt Taylor Vince as Caspar Abraham
 Krista Bridges as Anne Clark
 Jake Manley as Brad
 Eve Harlow as Taylor Kravid
 Clé Bennett as Harris 
 Aislinn Paul as Phoebe Frady
 Michael Therriault as Richard Schwenkman
 Peter Mooney as Francis Culp
 Toru Uchikado as Ren Shimosawa
 Hiro Kanagawa as Hachiro Otomo
 Lucius Hoyos as Jose Gutierrez
 Marco Grazzini as Oscar Gutierrez
 Carlos Lacamara as Father Mauricio
 Dylan Bruce as Captain James Dearing

Episodes

Webisodes: Dark Matters

Webisodes: Damen Peak

Broadcast
In Canada, the series was simulcast with the American broadcast. In Australia, the series began airing on September 30, 2015. The first two episodes that aired in Australia received 444,000 and 372,000 viewers respectively.
The series started broadcasting in the UK from February 16, 2016.

Reception 
Heroes Reborn received an average score of 53 out of 100 on Metacritic, indicating "mixed or average reviews". On Rotten Tomatoes, 42% of 50 reviews are positive, with the consensus stating, "Focusing on special effects and unearned melodrama at the expense of the original's initially intriguing narrative, Heroes Reborn is a series revival with seemingly limited prospects."

About the show's reception, Kring said: "Well, when you make a show like that, I was adamant about that show being a thirteen-episode event series, and having a closed-ended quality to it. I had always felt that one of the issue with Heroes was the ongoing nature of it was difficult to sustain, so I really loved the idea that this was a thirteen-episode event series, and when it was over, it was over. I don’t know that the audience ever really understood that that was the initial plan from the very beginning. So I think that it got a little confusing for the audience as to whether it was a reboot of Heroes, or whether it was just an event series. As much as we tried to say it every time in the press, I think that message may not have completely come through, that it was always intended to come to an end. So in terms of how it wrapped up, I feel a little remorse that I think a lot of people didn’t understand that it was supposed to wrap up when it did. We actually really felt very good about what we accomplished with the thirteen episodes."

Home media releases
Heroes Reborn - Event Series was released on DVD and Blu-ray disc on April 12, 2016 in Region 1 by Universal Studios Home Entertainment.

Other media
A video game tie in developed and published by Phosphor Games, Gemini: Heroes Reborn, released in January 2016 for the PlayStation 4, PC, and Xbox One to mixed reviews.

References

External links
 * 
 

 
2015 American television series debuts
2016 American television series endings
2010s American science fiction television series
American fantasy television series
American superhero television series
English-language television shows
Television series about genetic engineering
NBC original programming
Nonlinear narrative television series
Serial drama television series
American sequel television series
Television series by Universal Television
Television series created by Tim Kring
Television shows filmed in Kitchener, Ontario
Television shows filmed in Toronto
Television shows filmed in Los Angeles
Television shows set in Texas
American fantasy drama television series
2010s American time travel television series